The fourth edition of the Johan Cruyff Shield was held on 8 August 1999 between 1998–99 Eredivisie champions Feyenoord and 1998–99 KNVB Cup winners Ajax. Feyenoord won the match 3–2.

Match

Details

References 

1999
Johan Cruijff-schaal
J
J
Johan Cruyff Shield